Càrn Mòr (804 m) is the highest mountain of the Ladder Hills on the border of Aberdeenshire and Moray, Scotland. It is located northeast of the Cairngorm Mountains near Strathdon.

It rises high above Glenlivet in an area once renowned for its whisky smuggling.

References 

Mountains and hills of Aberdeenshire
Mountains and hills of Moray
Marilyns of Scotland
Corbetts